Rosenzweig, or Rosensweig is a German surname meaning "rose twig or branch" and may refer to:

People  
 Barney Rosenzweig (born 1937), an American television producer
 Cynthia E. Rosenzweig, a NASA scientist and climatologist
 Dan Rosensweig, former Chief Operating Officer of Yahoo!
 Ferdinand von Rosenzweig, an Austrian military officer
 Franz Rosenzweig (1887–1929), German-Jewish philosopher
 Gabriel Rosenzweig Pichardo (born 1957), Mexican diplomat
 Gerson Rosenzweig (1861–1914), writer and poet
 Harry Rosen (born 1931, originally Rosenzweig), founder of the Canadian men's wear store that bears his name
 Jake Rosenzweig (born 1989), an American racing driver
 Joseph "Joe 'The Greaser'" Rosenzweig, American racketeer in the early 1900s
 Luc Rosenzweig (1943-2018), French journalist
 Mark Rosenzweig (1922-2009), performed studies showing the brain continues developing anatomically into adulthood
 Rabbi Michael Rosensweig (born 1955), rosh yeshiva at Yeshiva University
 Michael Rosen, a British poet and children's storyteller
 Michael Rosenzweig, American ecologist at the University of Arizona
 Peggy Rosenzweig, an American politician
 Philip Rosenzweig (1954–2001), vice president with Sun Microsystems who died on American Airlines Flight 11 on 9/11
 Rachel Zoe Rosenzweig, an American fashion stylist
 Robert Rosenzweig, president emeritus of the Association of American Universities
 Ronald E. Rosensweig (born 1932), physicist, pioneer in the field of magnetic fluids
 Roy Rosenzweig (1950–2007), American historian
 Saul Rosenzweig (1907–2004), American psychologist and therapist
 Viktor Rosenzweig (1914–1941), Croatian communist, poet and writer killed during World War II

Entertainment, fiction, awards  
 Buber-Rosenzweig-Medal, an annual prize for Christian-Jewish relations, named after Franz Rosenzweig
 Chaim Rosenzweig, a fictional character in the Left Behind novels
 The Sisters Rosensweig, a play by Wendy Wasserstein

See also

German-language surnames
Jewish surnames
Yiddish-language surnames
Surnames from ornamental names
de:Rosenzweig